The Montyon Prize is a series of prizes awarded annually by the French Academy of Sciences and the Académie française. They are endowed by the French benefactor Baron de Montyon.

History
Prior to the start of the French Revolution, the Baron de Montyon established a series of prizes to be given away by the Académie Française, the Académie des Sciences, and the Académie Nationale de Médecine. These were abolished by the National Convention, but were taken up again when Baron de Montyon returned to France in 1815. When he died, he bequeathed a large sum of money for the perpetual endowment of four annual prizes. The endowed prizes were as follows:

 Making an industrial process less unhealthy
 Perfecting of any technical improvement in a mechanical process
 Book which during the year rendered the greatest service to humanity
 The "prix de vertu" for the most courageous act on the part of a poor Frenchman

These prizes were considered by some to be a forerunner of the Nobel Prize.

List of winners

 Jean Guénisset (1820)
 François-Xavier-Joseph Droz (1823)
 Antoine Germain Labarraque (1825)
 Friedrich Sertürner (1831)
 Alexis de Tocqueville (1835)
Philippe Ricord (1842)
 Jeanne Jugan (1845)
 Jules Verne
 Louis Pasteur (1859)
 Louis Melsens (1865)
 Joséphine Colomb (1875)
 Mary Mapes Dodge (1876)
 Axel Key (1878)
 Hector Malot (1878)
 George Henry Corliss (1879)
 Jacques-Arsène d'Arsonval (1882)
 Victor André Cornil 1886
 Louis Fréchette
 Charles Thomas Jackson
 Jean-Henri Fabre
 Marie Célestine Amélie d'Armaillé (1887)
 Claire Julie de Nanteuil (1888)
 Claire Julie de Nanteuil (1890)
 François Marie Galliot (1895)
 Juliette Heuzey (1897)
 Ludovic de Contenson (1902).
 Laure Conan (1903)
 Charles Nicolle (1909, 1912, 1914)
 Edward Tuck and Julia Stell (1916)
 Victor Babeș (1924)
 Armand Praviel (1925)
 Suzanne Lavaud (1932)
 Louise Thuliez (1935)
 Valentine Thomson (1937)
 Germaine Acremant (1940)
 Ivan Đaja (1946)
 Daniel Dugué (1947)
 André Giroux (1949)
 Alix André (1951)
 Nicolas Minorsky (1955)
 Kitty Ponse
 Antoine de La Garanderie (1970)
 Gaston Bouthoul (1971)
 Bertrand de Margerie (1972)
 Alexandre Jollien (2000)
 Alberte van Herwynen (2001)
 Charles-Nicolas Peaucellier
 René Guitton (2002)
 Michèle-Irène Brudny (2003)
 Jacques Julliard (2004)
 Joël Bouessée (2004)
 Henri Hude (2005)
 Renaud Girard (2006)
 Marie-Frédérique Pellegrin (2007)
 Jean-François Mattéi (2008)
 Myriam Revault D'Allonnes (2009)
 William Marx (2010)
 Stéphane Chauvier (2011)
 Bérénice Levet (2012)
 Anca Vasiliu (2013)
 Fabrice Wilhelm (2014)
 Nathalie Heinich (2015)
 Hervé Gaymard (2016)
 Denis Lacorne (2017)
 Gilles Lipovetsky (2018)
 Isabelle de Lamberterie (2019)
 Isabelle Mordant (2020)
 Jean Seidengart (2021)
 Neil MacGregor (2022)

External links
 Catholic encyclopedia entry

References

Académie Française awards
Awards of the French Academy of Sciences